William Henry Hodgkins (June 9, 1840 – September 24, 1905) was an  American politician who served in the Massachusetts State Senate, as a member and President of the Somerville, Massachusetts, Common Council and as the eighth Mayor of Somerville, Massachusetts.

See also
 119th Massachusetts General Court (1898)

Notes

External links
 

1840 births
1905 deaths
Republican Party Massachusetts state senators
People of Massachusetts in the American Civil War
Mayors of Somerville, Massachusetts
Massachusetts city council members
19th-century American politicians